Gregory Duralev (born 3 March 1979) is a Russian former bodybuilder, businessman, and economist who fled his home country in 2015 after writing his civil initiative on Strategy to develop the Russian economy by supporting medium and small business and comprehensive program to fight against corruption and uploading it directly to the website of the President of Russia V.V. Putin. Subsequently, Duralev being charged with fraud under fabricated allegations.

Arriving in the United States, he applied for political asylum on January 25, 2016 and was permitted by the U.S. Department of Homeland Security to remain in the United States until his application would be decided. However, in September 2018, while awaiting the decision of his asylum application, he was arrested by the subdivision of the U.S. Department of Homeland Security - Immigration and Customs Enforcement in Los Angeles on the charge of remaining in the United States without permission notwithstanding that the permission allowing Duralev to remain in the United States as an asylum seeker was still valid.

The official narrative signed by the immigration officers revealed that the reason of the conducted arrest was the INTERPOL Red Notice issued for Duralev on Russian request even though such an arrest in specific circumstances was outside of the official power given to the U.S. Department of Homeland Security by the United States legislation. Duralev was sent to the immigration detention that was situated in the maximum security prison - Theo Lacy Facility in Orange, California from where he was relocated several times to the different immigration facilities in California. Until early 2020, when Duralev was released on Immigration bond, he had been detained for approximately 525 days in the United States for administrative violation that he had never committed.

Before an arrest Duralev established a cryptocurrency mining farm specializing on mining Litecoin on professional ASIC devices working on Scrypt algorithm. The farm situated in Reno, Nevada and was ranked as 23-25 in the world among the farms connected to Litecoinpool.org. However, it was destroyed caused by the arrest and detention of Duralev.

After he was released Duralev applied and was admitted to the Washington University School of Law. Duralev is still pursuing his immigration case along with the reinstatement of his right that should have been secured but was violated by the United States having undertaken the important international legal obligation before the United Nations under Refugee Act of 1980 and Protocol Relating to the Status of Refugees of 1967.

References

People from Barnaul
Russian economists
U.S. Immigration and Customs Enforcement
Living people
Russian dissidents
1979 births
Russian Presidential Academy of National Economy and Public Administration alumni
Washington University School of Law alumni
Altai State Technical University alumni